Mitribah is a weather station (40551 in the World Meteorological Organization database) in northwest Kuwait.

References

Populated places in Kuwait